Itzhak Manamto Asefa (born 19 November 1998) is an Israeli footballer who plays as midfielder for F.C. Ashdod in Israeli Premier League.

Asefa was born in Ethiopia to a Jewish family. At the age of 8, his family immigrated to Israel.

On 30 January 2020, the District court sentenced Asefa to 4.5 years in prison, after finding him guilty of leaving the scene of an accident without stopping to assist the injured victim. He was never convicted of vehicular homicide, as the police concluded that the victim, Ari Nesher, son of well known Israeli film producer Avi Nesher, was to blame for the accident. Ari was sitting illegally on the electric bike of his friend, in violation of the law that prohibits more than one person on a bike. In addition, neither lad was wearing a helmet,  also required by law. Initially it was suspected he had been drunk, but this was never proven. The Supreme Court reduced his sentence to 3 years. On the 16th of January 2022 he was released, after getting reduced time for good behavior.

References 

1998 births
Living people
Ethiopian Jews
Ethiopian emigrants to Israel
Citizens of Israel through Law of Return
Israeli footballers
Israeli Jews
F.C. Ashdod players
Bnei Yehuda Tel Aviv F.C. players
Liga Leumit players
Israeli Premier League players
Israel youth international footballers
Association football midfielders